Kenny Kwan Chi-Bun (born December 30, 1980) is a Philippine-born Hong Kong singer-songwriter and actor, under the music label Emperor Entertainment Group. He was born in the Philippines but grew up in Hong Kong.

At age 20, he and his friend, Steven Cheung were created as members of Boy'z, which is now known as Sun Boy'z.

In 2005, Kenny was asked to leave Boy'z so he could pursue his career as a solo artist. He has since released three albums (July 2005, December 2005, and July 2006) called "Oncoming", "Musick", and "Mie Wo Sagashite", respectively. On July 13, 2006, Kenny released his newest album called "Mie Wo Sagashite" with a 160-page photo book.

In 2007, Kenny was a guest at the Success Gala in Vancouver, where he performed and raised money for the organization. Kenny was also featured in Sun Boy'z' new song, 3+1=1 in their second album All For 1. This marks their first collaboration since he left the group.

In the year of 2010, Kenny and Steven rejoin the band Boyz and had a new album called "Ready to Go" in the year of 2011.With his album "Ready to Go",he had won "The Best Mandarin Song" for Sexy Body in an award ceremony in the year 2012 with AK and William Chan.

In the year of 2011, he participated in the short micro drama "Banana Boy", with June Ng, Caesar Lee and few more banana boys. His popularity rise up after this show and also another show in 2013 with China famous actress Zhao Li Ying in 追鱼传奇. He is now filming with Zhao Li Ying and Allen Ting in "Wife's Secret". He has two roles in "Wife's Secret". Besides, he is also in Ruby Lin's series Singing All Along as Deng Yu.

In 2016, he released an album called 角色, including old songs + new songs, this was his first solo album since the release of Kenny's Essentials in 2008.

In 2021, he released a Cantonese album – 前面是新的歲月記得走下去 - including collaborations with SHIMICA and Cherry Ngan 顏卓靈

Discography 
 2005: Oncoming
 2005: Musick
 2006: Mie Wo Sagashite
 2007: In Progress
 2008: Kenny's Essentials

Filmography 
 The Death Curse (2003)
 Pa Pa Loves You (2004)
 New Police Story (2004) [cameo]
 Fantasia (2004)
 Love Battlefield (2004)
 6 AM (2004)
 Bug Me Not! (2005)
 A Chinese Tall Story (2005)
 Trivial Matters (2007)
 The Sparkle in the Dark (2008)
 The Deserted Inn (2008)
 Stage of Youth (2008)
 Pandora's Booth (2009)
 The Jade and the Pearl (2010)
 Nightmare (2011)
 Who in the Mirror (2012)
 Legend of Chasing Fish (2013)
 The Fox Lover (2013)
 As the Light Goes Out (2014)
 Your Highness (2017)
 Blood Fist (2018)
 The Fallen (2019)
 The Twin Flower Legend (2020)
 Green Dragon Crescent Blade (2021)
 White War (2021)
 Back From the Brink (2022)

References

External links 
 Kenny Kwan Official forum 
 Boy'z And Kenny Kwan S'pore Forum
 EEG Music's Website
 Kenny Kwan Interview
 Boyz Malaysia Fan Club

1980 births
Living people
Cantopop singers
Hong Kong male singers
Sun Boy'z members
Hong Kong idols